Lloyd Edward Hampton (June 18, 1941 – 2011) was a Canadian politician. He served in the Legislative Assembly of Saskatchewan from 1982 to 1985, as a Progressive Conservative member for the constituency of Canora.

He was briefly affiliated with the Western Canada Concept Party of Saskatchewan.

References

Progressive Conservative Party of Saskatchewan MLAs
1941 births
Living people
Western Canadian separatists
Western Canada Concept politicians